The Shortest Day is a 1963 Italian comedy film. It is a parody of the war movie The Longest Day and stars the popular duo Franco and Ciccio in the leading roles. Dozens of other well-known actors, from both European and American cinema, agreed to appear in the movie in cameo roles for free to avert the bankruptcy of the production company, Titanus.

Plot
Two Sicilians, Franco and Ciccio, are taken from a small town in Sicily and shipped out with a unit in the Italian army which has to fight the Austrian troops in World War I. Upon war's end, Franco and Ciccio, more clumsy than ever, return to Italy but find themselves out of work.

Cast

Gino Cervi
Totò
Annie Girardot
Ugo Tognazzi
Eduardo De Filippo
Peppino De Filippo
Aldo Fabrizi
Gabriele Ferzetti
Philippe Leroy
Amedeo Nazzari
Tomas Milian
Romolo Valli
Renato Salvatori
Paolo Stoppa
Walter Chiari
Franca Valeri
Anouk Aimée
Franco Citti
Sylva Koscina
Virna Lisi
Carlo Pisacane
Giuliano Gemma
Massimo Girotti
Mario Girotti
Franco Fabrizi
David Niven
Erminio Macario
Tiberio Murgia
Raimondo Vianello
Memmo Carotenuto
Nino Castelnuovo
Luciano Salce
Nino Taranto
Aroldo Tieri
Yvonne Sanson
Simone Signoret
Susan Strasberg
Valentina Cortese
Lorella De Luca
Sandra Mondaini
Ilaria Occhini
Antonio Acqua
Ivo Garrani
Sergio Fantoni
Paolo Ferrari
Ángel Aranda
Fiorenzo Fiorentini
Paolo Panelli
Teddy Reno
Alberto Lupo
Fausto Tozzi
Enrico Viarisio
Pierre Brice
Aldo Bufi Landi
Vittorio Caprioli
Gordon Scott
Joe Sentieri
Massimo Serato
Gabriele Tinti
Jacques Sernas
Nino Terzo
Franco Sportelli
Luisella Boni
Lia Zoppelli
Lilla Brignone
Rossella Como
Scilla Gabel
Cristina Gaioni
Mark Damon
Nora Ricci
Rina Morelli
Antonella Lualdi
Frank Latimore
Franco Giacobini
Stewart Granger
Gérard Herter
Franco Balducci
Alberto Farnese
Gianni Garko
Maurizio Arena
Giacomo Furia
Stelvio Rosi
Umberto Orsini
Luigi Pavese
Emilio Pericoli
Walter Pidgeon
Steve Reeves
Roberto Risso
Mac Ronay
Folco Lulli
Piero Lulli
Ettore Manni
Rik Battaglia
Francesco Mulé
Jean-Paul Belmondo
Vittorio Gassman
Aldo Giuffrè
Renata Mauro
Sandra Milo

References

External links

1963 films
1960s Italian-language films
1960s buddy comedy films
1960s parody films
Italian World War I films
Titanus films
Macaroni Combat films
Italian buddy comedy films
Military humor in film
Italian parody films
Films scored by Piero Piccioni
1960s war comedy films
1963 comedy films
1960s Italian films